Mogoi is a small town in West Papua, Indonesia. The town is located in the southeastern-central part of the Bird's Head Peninsula.

References

Populated places in West Papua